Pentti Rummakko (12 October 1943 – 9 December 2008) was a Finnish long-distance runner. He competed in the marathon at the 1968 Summer Olympics.

References

External links
 

1943 births
2008 deaths
Athletes (track and field) at the 1968 Summer Olympics
Finnish male long-distance runners
Finnish male marathon runners
Olympic athletes of Finland
People from Saarijärvi
Sportspeople from Central Finland